George Macfarlane or MacFarlane may refer to:

George MacFarlane (1878–1932), Canadian-born American actor 
George Bennett MacFarlane (1837–1898), judge of the Supreme Court of Missouri
George G. Macfarlane (1916–2007), British engineer and scientific administrator
George W. Macfarlane (1849–1921), British businessman, courtier and politician of the Kingdom of Hawaii
George McFarlane, British musician, member of the bands Grand Hotel, The Quick and Giant Steps